Arthur Palmer may refer to:

 Arthur Palmer (politician) (1912–1994), British politician
 Arthur Palmer (priest) (1807–1881), Anglican priest
 Arthur Palmer (scholar) (1841–1897), Canadian-Irish classical scholar
 Arthur Hunter Palmer (1819–1898), Australian politician and Premier of Queensland
 Arthur Power Palmer (1840–1904), British Commander-in-Chief, India